Gilles Dewaele (born 13 February 1996) is a Belgian footballer who plays as the right back for Belgian club Standard Liège. He comes from Cercle's youth team.

Club career
Dewaele made his debut on 25 October 2013 at the 12th matchday of the season in the Jupiler Pro League. Dewaele substituted Tim Smolders after 76 minutes in a 1-1 draw against K.A.A. Gent.

References

External links
 

1996 births
Living people
Association football midfielders
Belgian footballers
Belgium youth international footballers
Cercle Brugge K.S.V. players
K.V.C. Westerlo players
K.V. Kortrijk players
Standard Liège players
Challenger Pro League players
Belgian Pro League players
Flemish sportspeople